Cratilla lineata, the line forest-skimmer, emerald-banded skimmer or pale-faced forest-skimmer, is a species of dragonfly in the family Libellulidae. It is found in many Asian countries.

Description and habitat
It is a medium-sized dragonfly with metallic-blue frons and brown-capped grey eyes. Its thorax is bronze-black, marked with yellow. There is a mid-dorsal carina, and an anterior and a posterior stripes narrowly separated and very irregular in shapes. There are four stripes on each side, the first and third rather broad, the others narrow. Abdomen is black, marked with bright ochreous-yellow. Segments 1 and 2 have moderately broad lateral and mid-dorsal stripes. Segments 3 to 8 have fine stripes bordering the ventral borders of segments and mid-dorsal carina. Arial appendages are black. Female is similar to the male.

It is commonly found in forested areas in lowland and montane regions. Prefers to breed in shaded muddy pools and marshes in forest.

Subspecies
Three subspecies are recognized.
 Cratilla lineata assidua Lieftinck, 1953
 Cratilla lineata calverti Foerster, 1903
 Cratilla lineata lineata Brauer, 1878

See also 
 List of odonates of Sri Lanka
 List of odonates of India
 List of odonata of Kerala

References

 lineata.html World Dragonflies
 Animal diversity web
 Query Results

External links

Libellulidae
Insects described in 1878